Mizi Xia was a semi-legendary figure from the Zhou dynasty Period of China.  He was first recorded in the work Han Feizi, by Legalist philosopher Han Fei, as the companion of the historical figure Duke Ling of Wei.  While Mizi Xia may have actually existed, nothing is known about him beyond this story.

Mizi Xia was the favored courtier of Duke Ling because of his beauty.  When Mizi Xia got news that his mother was ill, he forged an order from the Duke to use a ducal carriage to travel quickly to see her, and was praised for his filial piety.  Another time, Mizi Xia bit into an especially delicious peach and gave the remainder to the Duke as a gift so he could taste it as well.  Both acts ingratiated him further with the ruler.  However, once Mizi Xia's looks faded, the Duke turned against him, claiming he stole the carriage and then insulted the Duke by offering him a half-eaten peach.

Han Fei's primary goal in telling the story was to caution courtiers against getting too close to fickle rulers, but in later Chinese literature Mizi Xia became more alluded to for his beauty and his homosexuality.  The phrase "bitten peach" became a byword for homosexuality and Mizi Xia became a byword for a young man desired as a sexual partner.  Similar allusions would be later be applied to the "passion of the cut sleeve" and the Han dynasty courtier Dong Xian.

Ruan Ji was one of the more famous poets to laud Mizi Xia in his writing.  The Liang dynasty poet Liu Zun wrote, "Favors of the cut sleeve are generous,/ Love of the half-eaten peach never dies," confident that any educated person reading the poem would know exactly to whom he alluded.  The earliest extant Chinese document to address homosexuality, the "Poetical Essay on the Supreme Joy" by Bo Xingjian, lists Mizi Xia amongst the famous examples of homosexuality: "Mizi Xia shared a peach with his lord".

By the 12th century, male companions no longer tended to wield great power at the ducal or imperial courts, and the name Mizi Xia had become associated with common male prostitutes.  The narrowing of gender roles under the Qing dynasty and the influence of homophobic attitudes from the West would eventually make mention of "the bitten peach" completely taboo, so that today Mizi Xia is mostly unknown inside China.

Mizi Xia's story became known to the broader world through the writings of Europeans such as in Sexual Life in Ancient China by Robert van Gulik.  This book quotes from the early-20th century Xiangyan congshu or "Collected writings on fragrant elegance", which itself drew on earlier precedents such as those mentioned above.

References

Legendary Chinese people
Zhou dynasty people
Chinese LGBT people
Ancient LGBT people
Wey (state)
6th-century BC Chinese people
Male lovers of royalty